The Logan County District Library is a public library system that serves communities throughout Logan County, Ohio, United States.

The system's central library, which is also its oldest and largest branch, is the Knowlton Library, located along Main Street (U.S. Route 68) in downtown Bellefontaine.  The Knowlton Library was named for Austin Eldon Knowlton, for whom the school of architecture at Ohio State University is also named.

Although the current structure was only completed in 1994, the library has occupied a location in downtown Bellefontaine since its founding in 1901.  From 1905 until 1994, the library occupied premises at the intersection of Main Street and Sandusky Avenue (U.S. Route 68 and State Route 47), just south of its current location.  Construction of that library building, which is now occupied by Logan County agencies, was financed by Andrew Carnegie.

Other libraries
Branch libraries are also maintained in six villages throughout the county: De Graff, East Liberty, Lakeview, Rushsylvania, West Liberty, and West Mansfield.  Because of their smaller size, these branches offer fewer services and a smaller selection of books and media.

Two other public libraries exist in Logan County: the Sloan Library in Zanesfield and the Belle Center Public Library.  These two libraries are not part of the Logan County District Library system.

External links
Logan County District Library

Public libraries in Ohio
Education in Logan County, Ohio
Libraries established in 1901
1901 establishments in Ohio
Library buildings completed in 1994
Andrew Carnegie
Carnegie libraries in Ohio
U.S. Route 68